Jacquelin Michelle Maycumber (née Anderson, born 1979) is an American politician of the Republican Party. She is a member of the Washington House of Representatives, representing the 7th Legislative District.

Career
Maycumber served as the legislative assistant to Representative Shelly Short.

In February 2017, Maycumber was appointed to serve the remaining term of Representative Shelly Short after Short was appointed to the Senate. Maycumber won her retention election in November 2017.

Awards 
 2020 Guardians of Small Business. Presented by NFIB.

References

External links

1979 births
Living people
Republican Party members of the Washington House of Representatives
21st-century American politicians
21st-century American women politicians
Women state legislators in Washington (state)
People from Colville, Washington